Mousetrap (ASW Marks 20 and 22) was an anti-submarine rocket used mainly during World War II by the United States Navy and Coast Guard. Its development began in 1941 as a replacement for Hedgehog, a British-made projector, which was the first forward-throwing ASW weapon. Those, however, were spigot-launched, placing considerable strain on the launching vessel's deck, whereas Mousetrap was rocket-propelled. As a result, Mousetrap's four or eight rails for  rockets saved weight and were easier to install.

The rockets weighed  each, with a  Torpex warhead and contact pistol, exactly like Hedgehog.

By the end of the war, over 100 Mousetrap Mark 22s were mounted in U.S. Navy ships, including three each on 12 destroyers, and submarine chasers (usually two sets of rails).

Statistics
 Round weight: 
 Warhead: 
 Range: about 
 Firing speed: one round every 3 seconds (maximum)
 No. of rails:
 Mark 20: 4
 Mark 22: 8

Citations

Bibliography

External links

 ASW Weapons of the United States of America at NavWeaps
 ASW Weapons of World War II of Russia / USSR at NavWeaps

Anti-submarine missiles of the United States
Explosive weapons
Military equipment introduced from 1940 to 1944
Naval weapons of the United States
World War II naval weapons
World War II weapons of the United States